The 2015 Norfolk State Spartans football team represented Norfolk State University in the 2015 NCAA Division I FCS football season. They were led by first-year head coach Latrell Scott and played their home games at William "Dick" Price Stadium. They were a member of the Mid-Eastern Athletic Conference (MEAC). They finished the season 4–7, 4–4 in MEAC play to finish in a tie for sixth place.

Schedule

Source: Schedule

References

Norfolk State
Norfolk State Spartans football seasons
Norfolk State Spartans football